Fields in Trust, is a British charity set up in 1925 as the National Playing Fields Association (NPFA), by Brigadier-General Reginald Kentish and the Duke of York, later King George VI, who was the first president, which protects parks and green spaces and promotes the cause of accessible spaces for play, sports and recreation in British cities and towns.

As well as campaigning to protect playing fields and open space, Fields in Trust legally protects the King George's Fields, 471 public recreation grounds set up as a memorial to King George V.

History

The charity was set up in 1925 as the National Playing Fields Association (NPFA), by Brigadier-General Reginald Kentish and was founded by the Duke of York, later King George VI, who was the first president. This royal link continued with Queen Elizabeth II as Patron from 1952 until her death in 2022 and Prince Philip, Duke of Edinburgh, as President from 1947 until he stepped down in 2013 to be succeeded by his grandson William, Prince of Wales.

Fields in Trust is a charity incorporated by Royal Charter in 1932. The organisation was awarded the Olympic Cup in 1931 by the International Olympic Committee in recognition of its work providing Playing Fields in Great Britain.

The Charity’s affairs are conducted through its Council, which meets quarterly to set the policy of the Association and to oversee its work.  It is also linked to many other bodies, and the members of the organisation include local authorities, individuals, playing field associations, schools, and sports clubs.  In 1972, Fields in Trust (then the NFPA) supported the Bishop of Stepney, Trevor Huddleston, in denouncing the lack of play provision which had led to the deaths by drowning of two boys who lived in his diocese. This gave the impetus to the Fair Play for Children campaign.

Fields in Trust set standards for playground provision in the UK through the Six Acre Standard, which is widely recognised as a planning tool for local authorities as a basis, when stipulating play area provision for new housing development, and in local play policies. Fields in Trust is one of the agencies represented on the UK Government School Playing Fields Advisory Panel convened by the Department for Education to scrutinise the disposal or change of use of playing fields and school land.

Objectives

Recommendations on Outdoor Playing Space were first formulated in 1925, soon after the Association’s formation. This was with the intention of ensuring "every man, woman and child in Great Britain should have the opportunity of participating in outdoor recreational activity within a reasonable distance of home during leisure hours".

Since then, Fields in Trust have kept the recreational space standard under regular review.

In 1992, the Association revised its recommendations on recreational space to include the Children’s Playing Space Standard aspect of the Six Acre Standard - part of the recommendation then was a general statement of the need for adequate children’s playing space.

Protected Land 

Fields in Trust supervises the property over which the Association acts as Guardian Trustee and ensures that it retains its charitable purpose. The Fields in Trust charity has a role in the protection of over 2,800 parks, playing fields and nature reserves across the United Kingdom. In the 1920s and 1930s many of the sites were funded by the Carnegie United Kingdom Trust on the basis that the land would be kept as public playing fields in perpetuity. In all of its work, Fields in Trust is assisted by affiliated national and county associations and other partners.

King George's Field
Fields in Trust is the Trustee of the King George's Fields Foundation (KGFF).  The Foundation was established as a Memorial to the Late King George V by Trust Deed on 3 November 1936.  The objects of the Trust were "to promote and to assist in the establishment throughout the United Kingdom of Great Britain and Northern Ireland of Playing Fields for the use and enjoyment of the people every such Playing Field to be styled ‘King George’s Field’ and to be distinguished by heraldic panels or other appropriate tablet medallion or inscription commemorative of the King".

The Trust defined a playing field as "any open space used for the purpose of outdoor games, sports and pastimes".

These playing fields have their origins in an appeal launched shortly after the death of George V in March 1936.  Rather than finance the entire cost of a few schemes, grants were given towards the cost of as many fields as possible, the balance being raised by the local authority or other organisation providing the field and accepting responsibility for its maintenance.  In most cases, the responsible body entered into a Deed of Dedication declaring that the recreation ground shall "be preserved in perpetuity as a Memorial to His Late Majesty under the provisions of the KGFF and shall henceforth be known as a 'King George’s Field'." The NPFA would act, as administrator, to look at and consider proposals in order to allocate grants.

A Charity Commission Scheme was made on 1 December 1965 passing the trusteeship of the Foundation to the NPFA and, among other things,  widening the objects of the Foundation to include the "preservation" of the King George’s Fields.

Six Acre Standard
The Six Acre Standard aims to help land use planners ensure a sufficient level of open space to enable residents of all ages to participate in sports and games with an emphasis on access for children to playgrounds and other play space.

In its publication The Six Acre Standard, the FiT outlines a more detailed breakdown including a hierarchy of child play space.

The New Six Acre Standard
Fields in Trust reissued The Six Acre Standard under the new name Guidance for Outdoor Sport and Play in 2015 as an online reference work for planners in the UK. It has been updated to include the modern planning regime and new topics such as sustainability and the local environment. These areas come under the heading "Open Space"  which refers to all open space, and is deemed as a community asset, and value, and is protected by legislation in the Core Strategy (2006-2026). Versions of the Guidance for the devolved administrations of Scotland and Wales were launched in January 2017 as well as a Welsh Language edition.

Children's sports fields on educational land are not recorded as Open Space and are not protected by Open Space legislation. However, any change of use of educational land requires local or national government approval. The government decisions can be contested by the local community.

Queen Elizabeth II Fields Challenge

Queen Elizabeth II Fields Challenge, (known as the "Queen Elizabeth Fields Challenge" in Scotland), was a programme run by Fields in Trust aiming to protect outdoor recreational spaces across the UK to create a "grassroots legacy" in celebration of the 2012 Diamond Jubilee.

Presidents
The National Playing Fields Association has had a member of the Royal Family serving as president since their foundation in 1925:

 HRH Duke of York 19251936
 HM The King 19361948
 HRH Duke of Edinburgh 19482013
 HRH Prince of Wales 2013Present

See also

List of King George V Playing Fields
Urban planning
Gyro International, established 1912, sponsor of playgrounds in Canada and the United States

Notes

External links
Fields in Trust

Queen Elizabeth II Fields Challenge

King George's Fields
Monuments and memorials in the United Kingdom
Interested parties in planning in the United Kingdom
Environmental charities based in the United Kingdom
1925 establishments in the United Kingdom
Organizations established in 1925
Playgrounds